Franco Angrisano (10 May 1926 – 20 September 1996) was an Italian actor. He appeared in more than seventy films.

Life and career
Born in Potenza, Angrisano was mainly active on stage, where he often worked with Eduardo De Filippo.  He made his film debut in late 1950s, but his career in cinema was mainly confined to character roles. He was also active on television, in which he had roles of weight in several TV-series and television movies.

Filmography

References

External links 

1926 births
1996 deaths
Italian male film actors